SouthWest State University (former SWSU) (Yugo-Zapadnyj gosudarstvennyj universitet), for a time the КurskSTU, kurskij politeh. South-West State University was founded in 1964 as Kursk Politechnical Institute. Its current rector is Sergej Emeljanov. In 1995, the university was renamed to Kursk State Technical University. In 2010 it was renamed to South-West State University.

Faculties
As of January 2010, the university has 8 faculties. Here is the full list of faculties, according to the official web-site:
 Faculty of Innovations and Management
 Faculty of Informatics and Computer Engineering
 Faculty of Economics
 Faculty of Building and Architecture
 Faculty of Technologies and Design
 Faculty of Law
 Faculty of Mining
 Faculty of Linguistics and Cross-cultural Communications

References

External links

 South-West State University

Kursk
Universities in Kursk Oblast
Technical universities and colleges in Russia